Waterloo is a suburb of Poole, Dorset, England.

Once a small village near Broadstone, Waterloo is now a large housing estate.

References

Areas of Poole
Populated places established in the 1950s